Anthidium taeniatum is a species of bee in the family Megachilidae, the leaf-cutter, carder, or mason bees.

Synonyms
Synonyms for this species include:
Anthidium fasciatum Latreille, 1809
Anthidium sulphureum Lepeletier, 1841
Anthidium affine Morawitz, 1873
Anthidium affine var monile Friese, 1897
Anthidium affine var nostrum Radoszkowski, 1893
Anthidium frontevillosum Pasteels, 1969

References

taeniatum
Insects described in 1809